Kathanayakudu ( Protagonist) is a 1984 Indian Telugu-language drama film produced D. Ramanaidu on Suresh Productions banner and directed by K. Murali Mohana Rao. Starring Nandamuri Balakrishna, Vijayashanti  and music composed by Chakravarthy. The film was remade in Hindi as Dilwaala (1986).

Plot
The film begins with Justice Rajeswari Devi a rectitude who lives with her two younger brothers Mohan & Ravi. Ravi is a stalwart who stands for the welfare of the public and they deify him. To endeavor it, he moves out of law and rifles against the idle politicians. MP Chandra Shekar Rao and MLA Kunti Kanakaiah are among them and in turn, he receives their enmity for his opprobrium. Here, a gap arose between Rajeswari Devi and Ravi as their paths are divergent which leads him to quit the house. After a few donnybrooks, Padma daughter of Kanakaiah loves Ravi. 

In tandem, Mohan counterfeits himself as upright a man of depravity. In a jiffy, he lures a club dancer Saroja. Being aware that Mohan is the brother of Rajeswari Devi Saroja’s father Seshu malice. Since he is discarded vagabond husband of Rajeswari Devi. He also raised their daughter Saroja against her mother. During the time of the general election, Chandra Shekar Rao employs a stratagem by knitting his son Raghu with Saraswathi daughter of labor union leader Edukondalu, and triumphs. Soon after, he conspires to squat in their labor colony which Edukondalu refuses. So, they slaughter Saraswathi and engender it as an accident. 

Now the case is under the trial of Rajeswari Devi, Chandra Shekar Rao tries hard to subdue Rajeswari Devi together with Seshu but she does not yield. So, they coalesce with a ruffian King Kong. All of them concoct by setting up a maid Kotamma who wiles Mohan and extorts Rajeswari Devi. Thus, as a counterattack, she espouses Mohan with Kotamma. During the time of their honeymoon, the means colludes by killing Kotamma, and Mohan is arraigned. In the next step, Ravi & Rajeswari Devi defies and moves in their tracks to unveil the truth. 

Rajeswari Devi resigns and takes up the case as a defense council when Saroja becomes hard proof against Mohan as a payback. Afterward, Ravi dispels Saroja’s fallacy and unites with her mother. Forthwith, Saroja divulges the actuality before the judiciary which is denied and Rajeswari Devi is on the verge to lose. During that plight, Ravi forwards in his way, abducts Raghu, and makes him confess their sins. But unfortunately, King Kong slays Saroja when Rajeswari Devi accepts her defeat and boasts Ravi to go ahead. At last, Ravi ceases the baddies and acquits Mohan. Finally, the movie ends on a happy note with the marriage of Ravi & Padma.

Cast

 Nandamuri Balakrishna as Ravi 
 Vijayashanti as Padma
 Gollapudi Maruthi Rao as M.P.Chandra Sekhar Rao 
 Sharada as Justice Rajeswari Devi
 Allu Ramalingaiyah as M.L.A. Kunti Kanakaiah 
 Chandra Mohan as Mohan 
 Nutan Prasad as S.I.
 Paruchuri Gopala Krishna as King Kong
 P. L. Narayana as Eedukondalu
 Devadasu Kanakala as Seshu
 KK Sarma as Watchman Narayana
 Chalapathi Rao as King Kong's brother-in-law
 Bhima Raju as Rowdy
 Balaji as Raghu
 Swapna as Saroja
 Shyamala Gowri as Kotamma
 Rajyalakshmi as Saraswathi
 Radha Kumari as Sujana
 Rama Prabha as Mahalakshmi
 Nirmalamma as Bamma

Soundtrack

Music composed by Chakravarthy. Lyrics were written by Veturi. Music released on AVM Audio Company.

Others
 VCDs and DVDs on - VOLGA Videos, Hyderabad

References

1984 films
Films scored by K. Chakravarthy
1980s Telugu-language films
Telugu films remade in other languages
Suresh Productions films